Eleni Daniilidou and Vitalia Diatchenko were the defending champions, but decided not to defend their title together. Daniilidou played with Eva Birnerová, but lost in the first round to Lyudmyla Kichenok and Nadiya Kichenok.
Diatchenko played alongside Akgul Amanmuradova, losing in the semifinals to Paula Kania and Polina Pekhova.
They eventually won the title Anna Chakvetadze and Vesna Dolonc retired in the final after losing the first set 2–6.

Seeds

Draw

Draw

References
 Main Draw

Tashkent Open - Doubles
2012 Tashkent Open